Natashquan is a municipality in Minganie Regional County Municipality, Côte-Nord region, Quebec, Canada. It should not be confused with the adjacent but separate Innu reserve of Nutashkuan.

The municipality is named after the Natashquan River, which had already been mapped and named in the 17th century. It comes from the Innu language, meaning "where one hunts for bear".

In addition to the village of Natashquan itself, the municipality also includes the small community of Pointe-Parent that is located on the Natashquan River, directly adjacent to the Natashquan Reserve. It is home to some fishermen's homes and was served by a post office from 1953 to 1976. Once also known as Pointe-du-Poste and Village-du-Poste, Pointe-Parent was named after priest Pierre-Clément Parent (1733–1784) who served as missionary in Tadoussac and Labrador and died in Natashquan.

History

While Jacques Cartier had visited the area in 1534 and a trading post already existed in 1710 at the mouth of the Natashquan River, the settlement of Natashquan in the eponymous township was not founded until 1855 when the first settlers arrived. They were Acadians from the Magdalen Islands, particularly from Amherst Island (île du Havre Aubert). That same year, the Notre-Dame-de-Natashquan Mission was founded on the west bank of the Little Natashquan River. In 1869, the township was officially established, and in August 1872, the post office opened. In 1907, the place was incorporated as a township municipality. For many decades Natashquan was dependent on fishing, but nowadays few fishermen remain.

In 1958, the first electricity cooperative was formed and electricity was finally installed in homes. Television followed in the 1970s.

Before 1996, it was only accessible via boat or airplane. That year, Route 138 was extended to Natashquan, connecting it to Havre-Saint-Pierre and ending its isolation from Quebec's road network.

On June 18, 2016, Natashquan changed status from township municipality to a (regular) municipality.

Geography
The township is bordered on the east and south by the estuary of the Natashquan River, and encompasses an area that is riddled with numerous small ponds and lakes.

Climate
Natashquan experiences a borderline subarctic climate (Köppen Dfc) that is just short of being classed as a humid continental climate (Köppen Dfb). Summers are mild, moderated by the Gulf of St Lawrence and winters are cold and snowy, with annual snowfall averaging 140 inches (356 cm).

Demographics

Language
Mother tongue:
 English as first language: 0%
 French as first language: 96.2%
 English and French as first language: 0%
 Other as first language: 3.8%

Transport
The main road through Natashquan is Quebec Route 138, and it is also served by Natashquan Airport and Natashquan (Lac de l'Avion) Water Aerodrome.

Notable people
Natashquan was the birthplace of singer Gilles Vigneault, who named a song after the municipality ("C'est à Natashquan") on the 2008 album Arriver Chez Soi.

References

External links

 Natashquan official website

Municipalities in Quebec
Incorporated places in Côte-Nord
Minganie Regional County Municipality